Carlos A. Mannucci, known simply as Mannucci, is a professional football club based in Trujillo, La Libertad, Peru. The club is the most important in the city having represented Trujillo in the first division of Peruvian football in multiple occasions since the late 1960s. Its greatest accomplishment are its back-to-back Copa Perú championships and the three Regional Championships of Peru, Northern Zone (1985, 1987, 1991-I). The club has a long rivalry with Alfonso Ugarte, and matches between the two teams are known as ''El Clásico Trujillano''. In recent years, it has also developed a rivalry against the other professional club in the city, Universidad César Vallejo.

History

Establishment
Carlos A. Mannucci was founded as a multi-sport club on November 16, 1959 at the request of a group of female volleyball players that had until then been sponsored by Trujillo's Victor Lazarte Hospital. They requested the patronage of local businessman Carlos José Mannucci Vega and his mother Laura Vega de Mannucci who created the club in honor of their late father and husband Carlos Alberto Mannucci Finochetti.

The club first competed in local volleyball and basketball competitions with funding from the Carlos A. Mannucci Company. Eventually the club started participating in local football competitions after buying the spot of Club Mariscal Ramón Castilla. Its first season of competition was 1967.

Back-to-back Copa Perú titles
Just a year later, Los Carlistas reached the 1968 Copa Perú final in Lima and obtained promotion to the first division that same year. The last game on the final group stage was against Melgar from Arequipa. It defeated the Arequipa-side by 1–0 with a goal by Carlos Avalos.

The club's first spell on the top flight was short-lived as relegation during the 1968 Torneo Descentralizado consisted of one club from Lima and one from outside Lima. Out of the four provincial teams, Mannucci finished last in ninth place and was thus relegated back to the Copa Perú. The highlight of that campaign was a victory on the road against tournament favorites Alianza Lima by 1–2. Curiously, that game was played at Alianza Lima's rivals' stadium, Estadio Teodoro Lolo Fernández.

Their time away from the first division was short. Mannucci, with Paraguayan Miguel Ortega as coach defeated Melgar by 2–0 to win the 1969 Copa Perú, with goals from Jorge García and Alejandro Zevallos.

National tournaments 
They were one of the eight teams added to the national top-level for the 1974 season.

They won the Regional (Norte) stage of the national championship in 1985, 1987, and 1991 (first tournament).

The club's final relegation would come in 1994. The relegation battle would play until the last match-day. Cienciano managed a scoreless draw against Unión Minas which gave it an extra point over the Trujillo-side which earlier that day defeated Melgar, with two goals by Fabían Arias, but wasn't able to avoid relegation.

Relevant Copa Perú campaigns
Los Grifos were not able to obtain promotion since 1994 participating in the Copa Perú for most of the 1990s and all of the 2000s. While the team was always strong enough to overcome the local Trujillo district and provincial leagues, it found itself at an impasse in the Regional stage of the tournament which it was unable to overcome some nine times.

The club's best season of all its years in the Copa Perú was the 2009 season under the leadership of club president Daniel Salaverry. That year Mannucci overcame the Regional stage by defeating Ramón Castilla, Deportivo Municipal de San Ignacio, and Unión Tarapoto in group B. Its biggest challenge was San Francisco de Asis in the Round of 16. The first leg was for San Francisco de Asis which defeated Mannucci in Trujillo by 1–0. The second leg was played in Bagua. At the 75th minute, Juan Paico scored in a very even match. Two minutes later Luis Noriega scored a second to give the Trujillo-side the advantage necessary to move on to the quarter-finals.

Second Division spell
Carlos A. Mannucci did not reach the Copa Perú national stage again for another five years until 2013. It defeated Unión Deportiva Chulucanas in the Round of 16 but was unable to overcome Willy Serrato in the quarterfinals. Yet because of the team's great performance that season, it was invited to participate in the Second Division tournament for the first time in its history.

The club finished in 3rd place with 56 points in the 2014 season. It was deducted three points because it showed political advertisement for politician Joaquín Ramírez.

2018 Promotion to the First Division
The Peruvian Football Federation took control of the local domestic league from the Professional Football Sports Association, the tournament organizers, in 2018 and announced that the Peruvian first division tournament would be re-branded for 2019. With this re-branding, the tournament was expand from 16 to 18 teams.
At the beginning of the 2018 season, it was announced that the teams that finished 2nd and 3rd in the bottom two tiers of the Peruvian football league system would compete on the promotion play-offs at the end of the year to decide which two teams would receive the expansion slots.

Kits and crest
The first kit worn by Carlos A. Mannucci consisted of a black jersey and black shorts without any markings or crest. This style was used approximately until 1968. Since then the team's kits have been blue with white and red highlights which represent the colors of the city of Trujillo. The team's away kit is predominantly white with blue and red highlights.

Stadium
Their home stadium is Estadio Mansiche, which has a capacity of 25,000.

Honours

National

League
Cuadrangular de Ascenso:
Winners (1): 2018
Peruvian Segunda División:
Runner-up (1): 2018
Copa Perú:
Winners (2): 1968, 1969

National Cup
Copa Bicentenario:
Runner-up (1): 2021

Regional
Región II:
Winners (4): 1968, 1969, 1973, 2009
Runner-up (1): 2013

Liga Departamental de La Libertad: 
Winners (10): 1967, 1968, 1969, 1973, 1982, 1996, 2000, 2008, 2010, 2012
Runner-up (6): 1982, 2006, 2007, 2009, 2011, 2013

Liga Provincial de Trujillo: 
Winners (5): 1968, 1973, 1982, 1996, 2000, 2008
Runner-up (5): 2002, 2006, 2007, 2009, 2013

Liga Distrital de Trujillo: 
Winners (11): 1967, 1973, 1980, 1982, 1996, 1998, 2000, 2002, 2006, 2007, 2008, 2013
Runner-up (3): 1965, 1981, 2009

Performance in CONMEBOL competitions
Copa Sudamericana: 1 appearance
2021: First Stage

Women’s football
Liga Femenina: 
Runner-up (1): 2022

Current squad
As of 3 August, 2022

Managers
 Julio César Uribe (1992–94)
 Enrique Maximiliano Meza (2021-2022)

See also
List of football clubs in Peru
Peruvian football league system

References

External links
 Club Website
 50 best (retired, as of 2009) Carlistas at dechalaca.com

 
Association football clubs established in 1959
Football clubs in Trujillo, Peru